Spiculisporic acid is a bioactive γ-butenolide. It was originally isolated from Penicillium spiculisporum. Structural variants have been isolated from a marine Aspergillus.

Notes

Aspergillus
Lactones